The JUCO World Series is an annual baseball tournament held across three divisions of National Junior College Athletic Association baseball. Taking place in late May and early June each year, it determines the junior college baseball national champions. The first year in which the World Series was played across three separate divisions was 1993.

NJCAA Playoff Format 
The NJCAA baseball playoff format for reaching the JUCO World Series is generally the same for all divisions, regions, and districts with few exceptions. The postseason begins with a Region Sectional. This is a best-of-three series against another team from the region. Oftentimes the top eight seeds in a given region will be seeded one through eight. With this being the case, the number one team would face the number eight seed in the first round and so on. The four winners of these opening round series then advance to the Region Championship. The Region Championship is a four team double elimination tournament that determines the winners of each of the NJCAA's twenty-four regions. Each of the Region Champions then advances to the District Championship. The District Championship is generally a three-game series contested between two region champions to determine who receives that district's bid to the JUCO World Series. In Divisions I and II, the ten district champions continue on to the JUCO World Series where a double elimination tournament decides that year's national champion. In Division III, the seven district champions plus an at-large selection, a runner-up from one of the district championships, reach the JUCO World Series and play a double elimination tournament to determine the national champion.

Division I College World Series
Since 1977, the champion of each of the NJCAA's ten regionally defined districts advance to the event.  It is held as a ten team, double-elimination tournament.  Several different brackets and schedules have been used since the event began in 1958.  In the first season, the event was an eight-team bracket leading to placement, with the winners of their first two games playing for the championship, while others played for respective places.  In 1959, the NJCAA adopted the double-elimination format.  In 1977, the event expanded to ten teams, and has remained so ever since. The Division I College World Series is held annually in Grand Junction, Colorado at Sam Suplizio Field.

Division I Champions

Division II College World Series 
The NJCAA Division II College World Series is held annually in Enid, Oklahoma at David Allen Memorial Ballpark. The World Series was previously held in Millington, Tennessee from 1993 until 2008. It has remained in Enid, Oklahoma since 2009.  The Division II tournament is a double elimination tournament contested by the ten district champions. The Division II format is largely the same as the Division I tournament, being that there are ten teams competing for the national championship in a double elimination format.

Division II Champions

Division III College World Series 
The NJCAA Division III College World Series is held annually in Greeneville, Tennessee at Pioneer Park. The Division III World Series was originally held in Jamestown, New York from 1993-1994. It then moved to Batavia, New York from 1995-2004 before moving again to Glens Falls, New York for the 2005-2006 seasons. It was held in Tyler, Texas from 2007-2014. It changed sites once again for the 2015-2016 seasons when Kinston, North Carolina hosted. The World Series has been held in Greeneville, Tennessee since 2017. The double elimination tournament pits the seven district champions plus an at-large selection against each other to determine the NJCAA Division III baseball national champion. Unlike the Division I and II tournaments, there are only seven districts in Division III, rather than ten. This allows for a non-district champion to reach the finals with an at-large bid to round out the tournament at a more even eight teams.

Division III Champions

See also

National Junior College Athletics Association

References

NJCAA championships
NJCAA baseball
College baseball tournaments in the United States
Recurring sporting events established in 1958
NJCAA
Baseball in Colorado
Tourist attractions in Mesa County, Colorado
Grand Junction, Colorado